The Dezhou–Shangrao Expressway, designated as G0321 and commonly abbreviated as Deshang Expressway is an expressway in eastern China linking the cities of Dezhou and Shangrao.

It was formerly labeled G3W (G3-west).

Route

References

0321
Expressways in Anhui
Expressways in Henan
Dezhou-Shangrao Expressway
Expressways in Shandong
Dezhou-Shangrao Expressway